Seungri ("Victory"), is a South Korean singer-songwriter and actor

Seungri (승리; "Victory") may also refer to:
Sungri Motor Plant, North Korean factory
Sungni Station, station on the Pyongyang Metro
Sŭngri Station, station in Rason City
Sŭngri Refinery, located in the Special Economic Zone of Rason City in North Korea's northeast, with a refining capacity of 2 million tons

People with the given name Seung-ri include:
Ha Seung-ri (born 1995), South Korean actress
Lee Seung-ri (born 2000), birth name of Nancy Jewel McDonie or simply Nancy, member of Momoland